Říčky v Orlických horách is a municipality and village in Rychnov nad Kněžnou District in the Hradec Králové Region of the Czech Republic. It has about 100 inhabitants.

References

External links

Villages in Rychnov nad Kněžnou District